Pedras may refer to:
Pedras (footballer, born 1941), Portuguese footballer
Pedras (footballer, born 1980), Portuguese footballer